COCE may refer to:
 Conservation and Use of Wild Populations of Coffea arabica, a German research project, full name "Conservation and Use of Wild Populations of Coffea arabica in the Montane Rainforests of Ethiopia"
 Cocaine esterase, an enzyme